Beverly Emmons (b. December 12, 1943) is an American lighting designer for the stage, dance and opera.

Career
Emmons graduated from Sarah Lawrence College in 1965 and then worked as an assistant to Jules Fisher. Her first credit as a lighting designer was with the Off-Broadway play Sensations in 1970. Emmons first Broadway work was A Letter for Queen Victoria in 1975. She has been the lighting designer for many Broadway plays and musicals since then, most recently the revival of Annie Get Your Gun in 1999 and Stick Fly in 2011.

She has worked for ballet companies, including the Merce Cunningham Dance Company, and also for choreographers such as Martha Graham, Bill T. Jones and Trisha Brown. Her work for opera includes the Robert Wilson and Philip Glass opera Einstein on the Beach in November 1976 at the Metropolitan Opera House, and the Robert Wilson opera The Civil Wars: A Tree Is Best Measured When It Is Down, performed in 1986 at the Brooklyn Academy of Music.

She was on the graduate theater faculty of Columbia University, was the artistic director of the Lincoln Center Institute from 1997 to 2002, and is currently on the faculty of Sarah Lawrence College.

Awards and nominations
Tony Award for Best Lighting Design nominee
 1979 The Elephant Man
 1980 A Day in Hollywood/A Night in the Ukraine
 1987 Les liaisons dangereuses
 1994 Passion
 1995 The Heiress
 1997 Jekyll and Hyde
Drama Desk Award Outstanding Lighting Design nominee
 1979 The Elephant Man
 1982 The Dresser
 1994 Passion
 1995 The Heiress
 1996 Chronicle of a Death Foretold

Broadway
 2011 Stick Fly
 1999 Annie Get Your Gun (revival)
 1998 The Herbal Bed
 1997 Jekyll & Hyde
 1995 Chronicle of a Death Foretold
 1995 The Heiress (revival)
 1994 Passion
 1993 Abe Lincoln in Illinois (revival)
 1993 Shakespeare for My Father Associate Lighting Design
 1992 The High Rollers Social and Pleasure Club
 1990 Cat on a Hot Tin Roof (revival) Associate Lighting Design
 1988 Michael Feinstein in Concert: Isn't it Romantic
 1987 Les liaisons dangereuses Associate Lighting Design
 1987 Stepping Out
 1986 The Life and Adventures of Nicholas Nickleby (revival) Associate Lighting Design
 1986 Mummenschanz:"The New Show"
 1983 Doonesbury
 1983 Total Abandon
 1983 All's Well that Ends Well
 1982 Good
 1982 Is there life after high school?
 1982 Little Me (revival)
 1981 The Dresser
 1981 The Life and Adventures of Nicholas Nickleby Associate Lighting Design
 1981 Piaf
 1980 Amadeus Associate Lighting Design
 1980 A Day in Hollywood / A Night in the Ukraine
 1980 Reggae
 1980 Heartaches of a Pussycat
 1979 The Elephant Man
 1975 Bette Midler's Clams on the Half Shell Revue
 1975 A Letter for Queen Victoria

Projects
 Einstein on the Beach
 Merce Cunningham
 Executive Director of the Theatrical Lighting Database at the New York Public Library
 Executive Director of The Lighting Archive

References

External links

American lighting designers
1943 births
Living people
Sarah Lawrence College faculty